Jack Owen is a death metal guitarist.

Jack Owen may also refer to:
Jack Owen (footballer) (1866–?), Welsh football player for Manchester United
Jack Owen (trade unionist) (c.1890-1983), English trade unionist
Jack E. Owen of Tepper Aviation

See also
John Owen (disambiguation)

Jack Owens (disambiguation)